Penne Cathedral is a Roman Catholic cathedral dedicated to Saint Maximus in Penne, Abruzzo, Italy.

Formerly the seat of the Bishops of Penne, it became in 1949 a co-cathedral in the Diocese of Penne-Pescara, now the Archdiocese of Pescara-Penne (since 1982).

See also
Roman Catholic Archdiocese of Pescara-Penne

References

Penne, Abruzzo
Cathedrals in Abruzzo
Roman Catholic cathedrals in Italy
Churches in the province of Pescara
Romanesque architecture in Abruzzo